Airport Boulevard is one of the main thoroughfares in Mobile County, Alabama, and is one of the few non-federal roads in the county that enters the city of Mobile, having entered Mobile County at the Mississippi state line. It is an east–west highway.

In Mississippi, Airport Boulevard is known as Mississippi Highway 614. When it crosses the Alabama state line, its designation changes to Mobile County Highway 56 and its name changes to Airport Boulevard.

Location
Airport Boulevard is the most important east–west thoroughfare in the county which does not enter the downtown business district. Airport Boulevard is a two-lane highway from the Mississippi state line until it intersects with Snow Road in the western part of the county where it becomes a five-lane highway. It becomes a divided four-lane highway near the Mobile Regional Airport, territory which was annexed into the city in January 2008. Its first major intersection in the city limits is with Schillinger Road, a four-lane highway which has become a major shopping district over the years, which is what prompted the city to annex it around the same time as the airport. Airport continues as a four-lane highway until it reaches Cody Road (Mobile County Highway 37, the pre-2007 city limit in this area). Once it crosses Cody, Airport becomes a six-lane highway.

Airport continues through Mobile, having major intersections at Hillcrest, University, McGregor/Azalea, Downtowner, Montlimar/Yester Oaks, Interstate 65, Bel Air, Sage and Florida. East of the Florida Street intersection, Airport reverts to a four-lane highway until it reaches Williams Street where it becomes a two-lane road (with a turn lane) before transitioning into a two-lane side street. The last two major intersections of Airport Boulevard are with Dauphin Island Parkway (for which Airport serves as the northern end) and the Government Street (U.S. Highway 90)/Houston Street intersection. Airport continues east of Government Street very briefly where it finally terminates at Old Government Street.

Overview
Airport Boulevard serves as both the heart of Mobile and a geographic boundary. West of the Government–Houston intersection, the city of Mobile considers Airport to be the dividing line between the north and south sides, determining how the city allocates public services, such as garbage pickup.

Airport is a semi-controlled access thoroughfare between Azalea and Sage; some turns which would hinder traffic are forbidden from Airport onto north–south intersecting roads, with the service roads being the required method of entry.

Airport Boulevard serves as the north–south dividing line for Azalea Road and McGregor Boulevard. South of Airport the thoroughfare is a four-lane highway known as Azalea Road. North of Airport it is a two-lane neighborhood street known as McGregor Avenue, which traverses the upscale Spring Hill district.

Airport also serves as the dividing line between Yester Oaks Drive, which becomes Montlimar south of the highway, and McGregor Drive. Montlimar is a wholly commercial thoroughfare, which is a four-lane highway with a turn lane. Yester Oaks is a residential street that passes through the Spring Hill district.

Businesses
Airport Boulevard is ringed with service roads, primarily east of Azalea Road, which remain a prominent feature of the thoroughfare until it reaches Sage Avenue.

Mobile's major malls are located on Airport and the area around Airport and 65 was the premier shopping region until the development of the Schillinger Road area and the shopping centers in Baldwin County. In the last decade, the malls have seen many major stores leave. Airport is also home to Providence Catholic Hospital, which moved to its Airport location from a Midtown location in 1986.

Airport Boulevard has one educational facility, located outside of the Mobile city limits. That facility is Baker High School. Airport is also close to Corpus Christi Catholic School, which is located on McKenna Drive, which is a spur of Hillcrest roughly a half mile north of Airport and which can also be reached by Hillview Road, which is a spur of Airport.

Boundary line
Upon entering the city limits, Airport briefly serves as the north–south boundary line between City Council Districts 6 and 7 (with 6 to the south and 7 to the north). Furthermore, it is split evenly between City Council District 6 and City Council District 5. The boundary line is University Boulevard, with District 6 to the west and District 5 to the east. District 5 is currently represented by Reggie Copeland, the city council president, who has served on the council since 1985. District 6 is currently represented by Connie Hudson, who has served on the council since 2001.

Major subdivisions and neighborhoods along Airport include Huntleigh Woods, Willowbrook, Pinehurst, Bit & Spur, Ridgefield, Regency (home to one of Mobile's two synagogues), Jackson Heights, Sunset Woods, Yester Oaks, Llanfair, and Delwood (a neighborhood of 1950s era mansions with very unusual architecture).

References

Streets in Mobile, Alabama
Transportation in Mobile County, Alabama